Cenkova is a small settlement in the Municipality of Cerkvenjak in northeastern Slovenia. The area is part of the traditional region of Styria and is now included in the Drava Statistical Region.

The local chapel-shrine is a Neo-Gothic structure with a belfry and was built in 1920.

References

External links

Cenkova on Geopedia

Populated places in the Municipality of Cerkvenjak